Dancing on the Tables is a studio album by jazz bassist Niels-Henning Ørsted Pedersen, which was recorded in 1979 and released on the Danish SteepleChase label.

Reception

In his review for AllMusic, Scott Yanow said "The bassist contributed four compositions, which are joined by a Danish folk song. The nearly 15-minute "Dancing on the Tables" (which utilizes some childlike melodies) and the episodic "Clouds" are highlights of the continually intriguing and adventurous program".

Track listing
All compositions by Niels-Henning Ørsted Pedersen except where noted.
 "Dancing on the Tables" – 14:48
 "Future Child" – 1:37
 "Jeg Gik Mig Ud en Sommerdag" (Traditional) – 3:32
 "Evening Song" – 9:30
 "Clouds" – 10:19

Personnel
Niels-Henning Ørsted Pedersen – bass
Dave Liebman – tenor saxophone, soprano saxophone, flute
John Scofield – guitar
Billy Hart – drums

References

1979 albums
Niels-Henning Ørsted Pedersen albums
SteepleChase Records albums